Jonathan Spencer Willis (April 5, 1830 – November 24, 1903) was an American minister, farmer and politician, from Milford, in Kent County, Delaware. He was a member of the Republican Party, who served as U. S. Representative from Delaware.

Early life and family
Willis was born in Oxford, Maryland, attended the district schools there and studied under private tutors.

Willis married twice. To Annie Barratt Townsend (1843 - 1885), they had one daughter Elizabeth Townsend Willis (1864 - 1934). And to Edith Gillespie (1855 - 1914), they had one son Jonathan Spencer Willis, Jr (1892 - 1957).

Professional and political career
He taught school seven years and then entered the ministry of the Methodist Episcopal Church, serving charges in Maryland, Delaware, Philadelphia, New York City, and Stamford, Connecticut. He retired from the ministry in 1884 and settled on a farm near Milford, Delaware and engaged in fruit growing.

Willis was an unsuccessful Republican candidate for election in 1892 to the 53rd Congress, but was elected to the 54th Congress, serving from March 4, 1895, to March 3, 1897. He was an unsuccessful candidate, however, for reelection in 1896 to the 55th Congress, and returned to the full effort of agricultural pursuits.

Death and legacy
He died in Milford and was buried in the Barratt's Chapel Cemetery near Frederica, Delaware.

Almanac
Elections are held the first Tuesday after November 1. U.S. Representatives took office March 4 and have a two-year term.

References

External links
Biographical Directory of the United States Congress
Delaware's Members of Congress

The Political Graveyard

Places with more information
Delaware Historical Society; website; 505 North Market Street, Wilmington, Delaware 19801; (302) 655-7161
University of Delaware; Library website; 181 South College Avenue, Newark, Delaware 19717; (302) 831-2965

1830 births
1903 deaths
People from Milford, Delaware
People from Talbot County, Maryland
Methodists from Delaware
Burials in Kent County, Delaware
Republican Party members of the United States House of Representatives from Delaware
19th-century American politicians
19th-century American educators
Schoolteachers from Delaware